Filia is a village in southern Achaea, Greece. Filia is located at the northwestern foot of the hill Mouzakeika (Μουζακεϊκα), at 850 m elevation. It is 1 km south of Lefkasio, 20 km south of Kalavryta, and 45 km northwest of Tripoli. Filia's population in 2011 was 130 for the village, and 211 for the community, which includes the smaller villages Agioi Theodoroi, Kalyvia and Zevgolatio.

Population

People
Panos Paparrigopoulos, poet

See also
List of settlements in Achaea

References

External links
 Filia GTP Travel Pages

Populated places in Achaea